Falcatidae is a family of Paleozoic holocephalians. Members of this family include Falcatus, a small fish from the Bear Gulch Limestone of Montana. The family first appeared around the start of the Carboniferous, and there is some evidence that they survived well into the early Cretaceous, though its putative Cretaceous members were also argued to be more likely neoselachians.

Genera
Denaea 
Falcatus
Ozarcus?
Stethacanthulus 
Cretacladoides? – possible Early Cretaceous (Valanginian) member of the family

References

Carboniferous fish of North America
Symmoriiformes